"Lover, You Should've Come Over" is the seventh track on Jeff Buckley's album Grace. Inspired by the ending of the relationship between Buckley and Rebecca Moore, it concerns the despondency of a young man growing older, finding that his actions represent a perspective he feels that he should have outgrown. Biographer and critic David Browne describes the lyrics as "confused and confusing" and the music as "a languid beauty".

The song was covered by the English jazz pianist songwriter Jamie Cullum on his 2003 album Twentysomething, and has also been covered live by American singer-songwriter John Mayer, Australian singer-songwriter Matt Corby, and English rock band Nothing But Thieves. The song was also featured in the third episode of the ABC series FlashForward titled "137 Sekunden". The song was covered by Natalie Maines on her 2013 solo album Mother. American singer Nikka Costa included a version of the song on her 2017 album Underneath and in Between. In 2021, Joey Landreth (of The Bros. Landreth) released his cover version.

References

Jeff Buckley songs
1994 songs
Songs written by Jeff Buckley